Simon Parke (born 10 August 1972 in Oakham, Rutland, United Kingdom) is a former professional squash player from England.

Squash career
Parke won the World Junior Squash Championship title in 1990. As a professional player, he broke into the world's top-20 in 1991, and the top-10 in 1995. He was diagnosed with testicular cancer in December 1995, and underwent surgery in January 1996, followed by treatment which included chemotherapy. He returned to the professional squash circuit four months after his surgery.

Parke was part of the England team that won the 1995 Men's World Team Squash Championships and 1997 Men's World Team Squash Championships. He also won the British National Championships in 1998 and the US Open title in 1999. He also represented England and won a silver medal in the mixed doubles, at the 1998 Commonwealth Games in Kuala Lumpur.

He reached a career-high world ranking of World No. 3 (October 2000).

Personal life
Parke currently teaches at Leeds University, predominantly teaching the 'improvers' squad.

References 

 
 
 
 
 Squashsite article on Parke's retirement
 

1972 births
Living people
English male squash players
Commonwealth Games medallists in squash
Commonwealth Games silver medallists for England
Squash players at the 1998 Commonwealth Games
People from Oakham
Sportspeople from Rutland
Medallists at the 1998 Commonwealth Games